The 1990 British Speedway Championship was the 30th edition of the British Speedway Championship. The Final took place on 20 May at Brandon in Coventry, England. The Championship was won by Kelvin Tatum, while Simon Cross won a run off against Jeremy Doncaster for second place.

Quarter finals

Semi finals

Final 
20 May 1990
 Brandon Stadium, Coventry

{| width=100%
|width=50% valign=top|

See also 
 British Speedway Championship
 1990 Individual Speedway World Championship

References 

British Speedway Championship
Great Britain